The Harvard Museum of the Ancient Near East (HMANE, previously the Harvard Semitic Museum) is a museum founded in 1889. It moved into its present location at 6 Divinity Avenue in Cambridge, Massachusetts, in 1903.

Description
From the beginning, HMANE was the home of the Department of Near Eastern Languages and Civilizations, a departmental library, a repository for research collections, a public educational institute, and a center for archaeological exploration. Among the museum's early achievements were the first scientific excavations in the Holy Land (at Samaria in 1907–1912) and excavations at Nuzi in Mesopotamia and Tell el-Khaleifeh in the Sinai, where the earliest alphabet was found.

The museum's artifacts include pottery, cylinder seals, sculpture, coins, cuneiform tablets, and Egyptian mummy sarcophagi. Many are from museum-sponsored excavations in Jordan, Iraq, Egypt, Cyprus, Israel, and Tunisia.  The museum holds plaster casts of the Black Obelisk of Shalmaneser III, the Laws of Hammurabi, and the Stele of Esarhaddon, as well as a full-scale model of an Iron Age Israelite house. The museum is dedicated to the use of these collections for the teaching, research, and publication of Near Eastern archaeology, history, and culture.

History

Architectural firm A. W. Longfellow broke ground on the present HMANE site on September 27, 1900.  Construction was completed in spring of 1902, and the public portions of the museum were opened on February 5, 1903.

The museum's facilities were repurposed during World War II, and it was closed to the public from August 1942 through April 1946. Twelve years later it was closed again to the public, lasting from 1958 through 1982.

On October 14, 1970, a bomb was detonated on the third floor of the museum, which at that time housed the Center for International Affairs.

The museum reopened in April 1982, and then Harvard President Derek Bok spoke at the reopening ceremony. In December 2012, Harvard announced a new consortium, the Harvard Museums of Science and Culture, whose members were the Harvard Museum of Natural History, the Harvard Semitic Museum, the Peabody Museum of Archaeology and Ethnology, and the Collection of Historical Scientific Instruments.

In April 2020, Peter Der Manuelian, director of the museum, announced changing its name to the Harvard Museum of the Ancient Near East (HMANE), explaining that "The change is not a reaction to any particular event, but rather our attempt to reflect our core mission in clearer terms." He also announced a "virtual tour" of the museum's galleries, allowing visitors to view many artifacts in detail, even as the physical museum was temporarily closed due to the COVID-19 pandemic.

Functions

Exhibition and education
The museum (through the collaborative efforts of departmental faculty, curators, museum curatorial staff, and students) mounts exhibits, often in conjunction with university courses, which serve the university community and also attract the general public. The museum has an active public outreach program featuring tours for school groups and teacher training workshops. The museum also sponsors, either alone or in conjunction with other institutions, a number of public lectures each year. Through these educational efforts, the museum seeks to promote a wider understanding of the civilizations of the Near East and their great cultural legacies.

Teaching with the collection

The museum encourages Harvard University students and faculty to make use of the museum collections and facilities.  Objects can be used for coursework, viewing assignments, research papers, senior theses, dissertations, and teaching displays.  The basement seminar room is available for sections scheduled to view the collection.

Research and publication
The museum sponsors archaeological field research into the complex societies of the Near East, with special emphasis on those ancient cultures related to the world of the Bible. Each year more than 100 staff, students, and volunteers participate in the Ashkelon Excavations (The Leon Levy Expedition), led by Honorary Museum Director Lawrence E. Stager, Dr. Daniel M. Master, and Dr. Adam Aja. The museum, through its Harvard Semitic Series and Harvard Semitic Monographs, publishes archaeological, historical, philological, and cultural studies of the Near East, many of which present the research of the department faculty and their students.

External links
 Semitic Museum official site
 Department of Near Eastern Languages and Civilizations at Harvard

References

Harvard University museums
Archaeological museums in Massachusetts
Egyptological collections in the United States
Museums of Ancient Near East in the United States
Museums in Cambridge, Massachusetts
Plaster cast collections
Semitic studies
University museums in Massachusetts
Museums established in 1889
1889 establishments in Massachusetts
Buildings and structures completed in 1902
Georgian Revival architecture in Massachusetts